Dimitrios Papadopoulos or Dimitris Papadopoulos (Δημήτρης Παπαδόπουλος) can refer to:

 Demetrios I of Constantinople (Demetrios Papadopoulos, 1914–1991), Ecumenical Patriarch of Constantinople 1972-1991
 Dimitris Papadopoulos (basketball player) (born 1966), Greek basketball player
 Dimitris Papadopoulos (basketball coach) (born 1972), Greek basketball coach
 Dimitrios Papadopoulos (footballer, born 1950) (1950–2020), Greek footballer
 Dimitrios Papadopoulos (footballer, born 1981), Greek footballer
 Dimitrios Papadopoulos (general) (1889–1893), Greek Army general
 Dimitrios Papadopoulos (wrestler), Greek competitor at events such as the 2021 European Wrestling Championships